Cyathostegia is a genus of flowering plants in the legume family, Fabaceae. It belongs to the subfamily Faboideae. It is often considered to be a monotypic genus containing only Cyathostegia mathewsii. Some sources include Cyathostegia weberbaueri.

References

Swartzieae
Fabaceae genera